Rugged Water is a 1925 American silent drama film directed by Irvin Willat and written by James Shelley Hamilton and Joseph C. Lincoln. The film stars Lois Wilson, Wallace Beery, Warner Baxter, Phyllis Haver, Dot Farley, J. P. Lockney, James Mason, and Willard Cooley. The film was released on August 17, 1925, by Paramount Pictures.

Plot
A Cape Cod melodrama about the U.S. Life-Saving Service based on a novel by Joseph C. Lincoln. When the captain of the Setauket Life Saving Station retires, the second in command, Calvin Homer (Warner Baxter), expects to be promoted; but the appointment goes instead to Benoni Bartlett (Wallace Beery), a religious fanatic who has been named a hero as the only survivor of dangerous rescue that claimed the lives of his fellow crewmen at a neighboring station. Bartlett's daughter Norma  (Lois Wilson)) convinces Homer to stay in spite of her father's antagonistic ways. Soon a romance springs up between the two of them, even though Myra Fuller (Phyllis Haver) had already finagled a proposal out of Homer.  Myra, the village vamp, breaks off her engagement to him. When a storm blows, Bartlett's religious fanaticism proves to be nothing but a cover for his cowardice and he refuses to send his crew out to rescue a vessel in distress. Calvin takes the men out and effects the rescue. Bartlett is discharged, and Calvin is appointed to replace him. Driven insane by his experiences, Bartlett ventures out in a small boat in rough water, and Calvin rescues him. The old man dies from exposure, and Norma, having realized that Calvin was not responsible for her father's disgrace, seeks refuge in his strong arms.

Cast

Preservation
With no prints of Rugged Water located in any film archives it is a lost film.<ref>[http://www.silentsaregolden.com/arneparamountpictures.html Rugged Water at Lost Film Files: Paramount lost films - 1925]</ref>

See alsoGodless Men (1920)Stormswept (1923)Code of the Sea (1924)Sensation Seekers (1927)The Perfect Storm'' (2000)

References

External links

 
 
 Lobby poster

1925 films
1925 drama films
1925 lost films
American black-and-white films
Silent American drama films
American silent feature films
1920s English-language films
Films about the United States Coast Guard
Films directed by Irvin Willat
Lost American films
Lost drama films
Paramount Pictures films
1920s American films
Silent adventure films